Is Everybody Happy? is a catchphrase of Ted Lewis that was used in the song, "Wear A Hat With A Silver Lining" by Al Sherman and Albert Bryan.  The catchphrase also was the title of two films starring Lewis:
 Is Everybody Happy? (1929 film), an American Pre-Code musical film
 Is Everybody Happy? (1943 film), an American black and white musical film

Is Everybody Happy? may also refer to:

Music
 "Is Everybody Happy?", a song by Gigolo Aunts on the album Everybody Happy
 "Is Everybody Happy?", lyric from "Happy?" by Public Image Ltd on the album 9

See also
 Happy (disambiguation)

Catchphrases
Quotations from music
1920s neologisms